The Truth About Wives is a 1923 American silent drama film directed by Lawrence C. Windom and starring Betty Blythe, Tyrone Power Sr. and William P. Carleton.

Cast
 Betty Blythe as Helen Frazer
 Tyrone Power Sr. as Howard Hendricks
 William P. Carleton as Alfred Emerson
 Anna Luther as Letty Lorraine 
 Fred C. Jones as Harold Lawton
 John Daly Murphy as Colonel Bob Alton
 Marcia Harris as Maid
 Nellie Parker Spaulding as Mrs. Anthony Frazer
 Frankie Evans as Baby

References

Bibliography
 Robert B. Connelly. The Silents: Silent Feature Films, 1910-36, Volume 40, Issue 2. December Press, 1998.

External links
 

1923 films
1923 drama films
1920s English-language films
American silent feature films
Silent American drama films
American black-and-white films
Films directed by Lawrence C. Windom
1920s American films